Curbridge may refer to:
Curbridge, Hampshire
Curbridge, Oxfordshire